Tony Linfjärd, born 1963 in Gothenburg, is a Swedish guitarist, composer and music producer. He has, as a composer on demand, mainly composed and produced music for large-scale companies such as IKEA and Volvo, but also for drama, i.e. the children's movie Flickan och dimman ('The Girl and the Mist'). In his own production company Blue Ball Music, Tony Linfjärd has released several music albums in his own name, and his music on demand has been awarded both nationally and internationally.

Discography (in selection)

In his own name
2014 – Evergreen 2
2013 – Evergreen
2010 – In My Own Sweet Way
2001 – The Divine Comedy of Dante
1997 – Projects 1990–1996
1995 – Take Off
1990 – One

Production music for film

2006 – Jazz, Jazz, Jazz ...
1996 – Top Gear

Sources
 Swedish Film Database
IMDb

Notes

External links
 Official Website

Swedish guitarists
Male guitarists
Swedish composers
Swedish male composers
1963 births
Living people
People from Gothenburg
Swedish male musicians